Qayah Qeshlaqi may refer to:
 Qayah Qeshlaqi, Ardabil
 Qayah Qeshlaqi, East Azerbaijan